Transcription factor Sp8 also known as specificity protein 8 (SP-8) or Btd transcription factor (buttonhead) is a protein that in humans is encoded by the SP8 gene. Sp8 is a transcription factor in the Sp/KLF family.

Function 

Sp8 mediates limb outgrowth during early development. Sp8 deletion in mice resulted in severe exencephaly. Sp8 is a  zinc-finger transcription factor. The structural difference between Sp8 and Sp9 is only one amino acid. These transcription factors are Apical Ectodermal Ridge (AER) specific in limb development. The Apical Ectodermal Ridge signaling is important for specification of distal limb structures. Sp8 and Sp9 mediate Fgf10 signaling, which in turn regulates Fgf8 expression (Fgf10--->Fgf8). Fgf8 is essential for normal limb development, and without the presence of Fgf8 in early development, there would be a decreased length of the limb bud and possible failure of the limb tissue develop. Both Sp8 and Sp9 have been found in vertebrates. Although, so far only Sp8 has been proven to be present in invertebrates too. Under lab conditions, Sp8 replaced btd in Drosophila, showing that Sp8 and btd both have similar functions in limb development in both vertebrates and invertebrates. Gene knockdown in zebrafish displayed that Fgf8 expression is necessary for appendage development.

References

Further reading 

 
 
 
 
 
 

Transcription factors